Bagher Mohammadi (born 21 June 1991), also known as Masoud Mohammadi, is an Iranian professional futsal player. He is currently a member of Ghand Katrin in the Iranian Futsal Super League.
Bagher Mohammadi is a goalkeeper in the Iranian national team. He participated in the 2021 futsal world cup, which was won by the Portuguese national futsal team

References

External links 
 Bagher Mohammadi on Instagram

1991 births
Living people
Sportspeople from Tehran
Futsal goalkeepers
Iranian men's futsal players
Shahid Mansouri FSC players
Farsh Ara FSC players
Sunich FSC players